Sandberg may refer to:

People
Sandberg (surname)

Places
Sandberg, Bavaria - municipality in the district of Rhön-Grabfeld in Bavaria in Germany
Sandberg (Celtic settlement) - archaeological site on hill ridge in the northwestern part of the Weinviertel region of Lower Austria
Sandberg, California  - post office and small surrounding community in Southern California in the United States

See also
Sandburg
Zandberg (disambiguation)

ar:جاكسون (توضيح)
he:זנדברג
vo:Sandberg